1991 Academy Awards may refer to:

 63rd Academy Awards, the Academy Awards ceremony that took place in 1991
 64th Academy Awards, the 1992 ceremony honoring the best in film for 1991